Daniel Greco (born 11 July 1979) is a retired Swiss football striker.

Daniel Greco is a retired professional Swiss footballer who was playing position centre-forward for several clubs in Switzerland, in Italy, Carrarese Calcio C1 and was striker for the Swiss National team U18 and U21 which was trained by the Swiss football legend Köbi Kuhn. 
The Italian Swiss Player forced to retire early from his football profession due to several major injuries during his football career.

Career 

As an active youth football player he played his first Swiss Final championship with Servette FC vs Grasshopper Club Zürich, Category Junior C, in 1993. In 1994 he won the Swiss championship U 15, GEF and in 1995 the Swiss Champion Category B1, Fc Servette vs Fc Lugano.
 
Daniel Greco  signed his first professional contract with Grasshoppers Club Zürich in 1996 for a period of 5 years. There, he made his debut, where he won the Swiss Championship and Swiss cup in 1996 with U21 and scored in total 28 goals. 
Greco made his first appearance in the LNA league against Servette Fc in 1996. Further up Greco got pitched with Grasshoppers for the UEFA Champions League against Ajax Amsterdam, AJ Auxerre and Rangers F.C.

As a Swiss National Football player he played with U18 and U21 for the Euro Qualifiers with success. With the U21 Team, he scored a total of 6 goals in 8 matches.

Statistics show that Daniel Greco's scores were significant for the U21 Qualification Euro 2002. 
Overall Greco's stats as in Étoile Carouge FC LNB, SC Kriens LNA-LNB, FC Bulle, FC Luzern and FC Baden show an outstanding performance.

References

1979 births
Living people
Swiss men's footballers
Grasshopper Club Zürich players
Étoile Carouge FC players
FC Stade Nyonnais players
FC Aarau players
SC Kriens players
FC Luzern players
FC Baden players
FC Bulle players
Swiss Super League players
Association football forwards
Italian footballers
Footballers from Geneva